Encyclopedia Brown is a series of books featuring the adventures of boy detective Leroy Brown, nicknamed "Encyclopedia" for his intelligence and range of knowledge.  The series of 29 children's novels was written (one co-written) by Donald J. Sobol, with the first book published in 1963 and the last published posthumously in 2012. In addition to the main books, the Encyclopedia Brown series has spawned a comic strip, a TV series, and compilation books of puzzles and games.

Sobol's first Encyclopedia Brown book was written in two weeks; subsequent books took about six months to write. Its main publisher was Bantam Skylark.

Style
Each book in the Encyclopedia Brown mystery series is self-contained in that the reader is not required to have read earlier books in order to understand the stories. The major characters, settings, etc. are usually introduced (or reintroduced) in each book.

Books featuring Brown are subdivided into a number—usually ten or more—of (possibly interlinked) short stories, each of which presents a mystery. The mysteries are intended to be solved by the reader, thanks to the placement of a logical or factual inconsistency somewhere within the text. This is very similar to the layout of Donald Sobol's other book series, Two-Minute Mysteries. Many of the mysteries involve Brown helping his father, the local police chief, solve a crime; Brown outwitting town bully Bugs Meany, the leader of a gang known as the Tigers; or Brown being aided by Sally Kimball, his partner, close friend, and bodyguard. Brown, his father, or Sally invariably solves the case by exposing this inconsistency, detailed in the "Answers" section in the back of the book.

Formula
Often, these books follow a formula where the first chapter involves Brown solving a case at the dinner table for his father, the local police chief in the fictional seaside town of Idaville in an unspecified state. When Chief Brown barely tastes his meal, that is a cue he was handed a difficult case. He pulls out his casebook and goes over it with the family. Encyclopedia solves these cases by briefly closing his eyes while he thinks deeply, then asking a single question which directly leads to him finding the solution.

The second mystery often begins in the Brown garage on Rover Avenue, where Encyclopedia has set up his own detective agency to help neighborhood children solve cases for "25 cents per day, plus expenses - No case too small." This second case usually involves the town bully and mischief maker Bugs Meany, leader of a gang who call themselves the Tigers, who, after being foiled, will attempt revenge in the third mystery.

In the third mystery, the plot involves Encyclopedia's partner, close friend, and bodyguard, Sally Kimball, the one person under 14 years of age to physically stand up to Bugs. She is the only reason neither Bugs nor any of his Tigers ever try to physically attack Encyclopedia. Encyclopedia tends to dislike anyone whom Sally has a crush on, possibly indicating that he has a crush on her. Also intelligent, Sally once attempted—in the first book of the series—to prove herself smarter than Encyclopedia by stumping him with a mystery of her own creation. Ironically, the contest was held at the Tigers' clubhouse, with Bugs and the others cheering him on. However, she was beaten in the contest (although Encyclopedia admitted that she almost tricked him), after which she became his friend. In subsequent storylines Bugs or his gang usually set up some sort of trap to get Encyclopedia or Sally in trouble. However, as in the previous story, they make a key mistake which Encyclopedia exposes.

Later cases may find Encyclopedia assisting his father at a crime scene (rarely more serious than larceny, and Encyclopedia is always discreet when helping his father) or interacting with people around town, often exposing scams. One such example is a high school dropout and would-be con artist named Wilford Wiggins who spends time trying to dream up schemes to fleece kids out of their money. Like Bugs, his schemes have an inconsistency which Encyclopedia exposes.

In some cases it is Sally and not Encyclopedia who figures it out because, as she tells Encyclopedia, "You are a boy." In other words, she notices things that only a girl would find inconsistent. Sally further displays her intelligence in the various mysteries in that she often can deduce who committed the crime, or whether a certain person is lying, but she simply cannot always prove it.

Legacy
The Encyclopedia Brown books experienced some enduring popularity.

In 1976, the Mystery Writers of America honored Sobol and his Encyclopedia Brown series with a special Edgar Award.

Educators have used Encyclopedia Brown in classrooms to instruct students in skills such as writing reports. In 1986, the Society for Visual Education, Inc. published a filmstrip series, produced and written by Lynne V. Gibbs, with accompanying audio cassette tapes and workbooks for elementary and middle schools' use. The following four Encyclopedia Brown stories were utilized: The Case of the Missing Statue, The Case of the Happy Nephew, The Case of the Kidnapped Pigs, and The Case of the Marble Shooter. According to WorldCat's library catalog listing, "As super-sleuth Encyclopedia Brown solves four mysteries, he shows students how he fills out his reports, including selecting a topic, gathering information, taking notes, making an outline, and revising and editing."

Adaptations

Comic strip

From December 3, 1978, to September 20, 1980, Encyclopedia Brown was a daily and Sunday comic strip syndicated by Universal Press Syndicate.  The artwork was done by Frank Bolle, and Donald J. Sobol was credited as the writer. When the strips were collected into books in the mid-1980s, the strip was credited to Elliot Caplin, based on Sobol's characters. The strips adapted Sobol stories, both ones that had originally been Encyclopedia Brown tales and ones that had been part of Sobol's syndicated Two-Minute Mysteries features.

TV series
A  live action television series adaptation, also called Encyclopedia Brown, ran on HBO starting in 1989. Scott Bremner played the title role, with Laura Bridge playing Sally. The series ran for 8 episodes. It was produced by Howard David Deutsch and directed by Savage Steve Holland. Parts of the series were filmed in Provo, Utah.

The series began with an hour-long special, "The Case of the Missing Time Capsule", and subsequent six episodes were 30 minutes long.

"The Case of the Missing Time Capsule" (hour long special first aired on March 2, 1989, to kick off series and aired over 200 times on HBO) "Idaville is celebrating its 100th birthday by opening a time capsule left by the town founder. But before anyone can discover what riches it contains, the capsule is stolen! When E.B. and his friend Sally investigate, they find no shortage of suspects.
"The Case of the Missing U.F.O." (Case #529) aired first on 3/9/90. Something eerie is going on in Idaville when a flying saucer and flashing lights appear in the night sky. Encyclopedia Brown and his side-kick Sally interrupt their relaxing camping getaway to brave the unknown and uncover the mystery of the U.F.O.
"The Case of the Amazing Race Car" (case #524) first aired 3/16/1990. Davey looks like a sure winner in a funny car derby, that is, until someone steals his car. Encyclopedia Brown steps in to solve the mystery.
"The Case of the Ghostly Rider" (case #525) aired 3/23/1990. The ghost of the WildCat Kid has returned to haunt Old Glennville, can EB and Sally with a little help from Bugs Meany save the day?
"The Case of the Flaming Beauty Queen" (case #932) first aired 6/5/1990. Encyclopedia Brown investigates who set the fires in the library and whether the case of the hidden money is a scam or not.
"The Case of the Incredible Culpepper" first aired 7/10/1990. This episode does not seem to have been released to VHS. The big Idaville magic show is spoiled when a mountain lion belonging to The Incredible Culpepper is stolen. E.B. and Sally are immediately on the case and identify several suspects. With their typical detective skills they soon solve the crime and return the lion to Culpepper. The magic show finally entertains all the good folks of the town- Thanks to Encyclopedia Brown.)
"The Case of the Burglared Baseball Cards" (case #523) first aired 9/1/1990. Encyclopedia looks into the late night theft of a priceless collection of baseball cards.
"Encyclopedia Brown, The Boy Detective in One Minute Mysteries" released straight to video (This includes 5 of the Encyclopedia Brown stories from the books,  "The Case of the Scattered Cards", "The Case of the Foot Warmer", "The Case of the Bitter Drink", “The Case of the Civil War Sword", and "The Case of the Great Merko". This was also released to VHS.)
Many of these episodes were later released on VHS.

Film
In June 2013, Warner Bros. optioned the Encyclopedia Brown books into a feature film. Matt Johnson was in talks to write the movie. Roy Lee and Howard David Deutsch (producer of the 1989 Encyclopedia Brown TV series) and Jonathan Zakin were announced as producing.

Books 
The Encyclopedia Brown books, in order of publication (parentheses indicate numbers on original release cover art):

 Encyclopedia Brown, Boy Detective (1963, illustrated by Leonard Shortall , 1982 reissue )
 Encyclopedia Brown and the Case of the Secret Pitch (1965, illustrated by Leonard Shortall , reissued in 1976 as Encyclopedia Brown Strikes Again)
 Encyclopedia Brown Finds the Clues (1966, illustrated by Leonard Shortall )
 Encyclopedia Brown Gets His Man (1967, illustrated by Leonard Shortall  )
 Encyclopedia Brown Solves Them All (1968, illustrated  by Leonard Shortall )
 Encyclopedia Brown Keeps the Peace (1969, illustrated by Leonard Shortall )
 Encyclopedia Brown Saves the Day (1970, illustrated  by Leonard Shortall )
 Encyclopedia Brown Tracks Them Down (1971, illustrated by Leonard Shortall )
 Encyclopedia Brown Shows the Way (1972, illustrated by Leonard Shortall )
 Encyclopedia Brown Takes the Case (1973, illustrated by Leonard Shortall )
 Encyclopedia Brown Lends a Hand (1974, illustrated by Leonard Shortall , reissued as Encyclopedia Brown and the Case of the Exploding Plumbing and Other Mysteries)
 Encyclopedia Brown and the Case of the Dead Eagles (1975, illustrated by Leonard Shortall )
 Encyclopedia Brown and the Case of the Midnight Visitor (1977)
 Encyclopedia Brown Carries On (1980)
 Encyclopedia Brown Sets the Pace (1981)
 (15) Encyclopedia Brown Takes the Cake (1982) (Co-written with Glenn Andrews)
 (16) Encyclopedia Brown and the Case of the Mysterious Handprints (1985)
 (17) Encyclopedia Brown and the Case of the Treasure Hunt (1988)
 (18) Encyclopedia Brown and the Case of the Disgusting Sneakers (1990)
 (19) Encyclopedia Brown and the Case of the Two Spies (1995)
 (20) Encyclopedia Brown and the Case of Pablo's Nose (1996)
 (21) Encyclopedia Brown and the Case of the Sleeping Dog (1998)
 (22) Encyclopedia Brown and the Case of the Slippery Salamander (2000)
 (23) Encyclopedia Brown and the Case of the Jumping Frogs (2003)
 (24) Encyclopedia Brown Cracks the Case (2007)
 (25) Encyclopedia Brown, Super Sleuth (2009)
 (26) Encyclopedia Brown and the Case of the Secret UFOs (2010)
 (27) Encyclopedia Brown and the Case of the Carnival Crime (2011)
 (28) Encyclopedia Brown and the Case of the Soccer Scheme (2012)

Related works
Encyclopedia Brown's Record Book of Weird and Wonderful Facts (1979)
Encyclopedia Brown's First Book of Puzzles and Games (1980) (Note: Jim Razzi is listed as the author, with an acknowledgement of being based upon the Encyclopedia Brown series created by Donald J. Sobol.)
Encyclopedia Brown's Second Book of Puzzles and Games (1980) (Note: Jim Razzi is listed as the author,  with an acknowledgement of being based upon the Encyclopedia Brown series created by Donald J. Sobol.)
Encyclopedia Brown's Third Book of Puzzles and Games (1981) (Note: Jim Razzi is listed as the author,  with an acknowledgement of being based upon the Encyclopedia Brown series created by Donald J. Sobol.)
Encyclopedia Brown's Fourth Book of Puzzles and Games (1981) (Note: Jim Razzi is listed as the author,  with an acknowledgement of being based upon the Encyclopedia Brown series created by Donald J. Sobol.)
Encyclopedia Brown's Second Record Book of Weird and Wonderful Facts (1981)
Encyclopedia Brown's Book of Wacky Crimes (1983 )
Encyclopedia Brown's Book of Wacky Spies (1984 )
Encyclopedia Brown's Book of Wacky Sports (1984 )
Encyclopedia Brown's Book of Wacky Animals (1985)
Encyclopedia Brown's Third Record Book of Weird and Wonderful Facts (1985)
Encyclopedia Brown's Book of Comic Strips #1 (1985) (Note: This is a compilation of the "Encyclopedia Brown" newspaper comic strips. Elliot Caplin is listed as the author. Most of the comics are based on the Donald J. Sobol stories, but there are some original stories too.)
Encyclopedia Brown's Book of Comic Strips #2 (1985) (Note: This is a compilation of the "Encyclopedia Brown" newspaper comic strips. Elliot Caplin is listed as the author. Most of the comics are based on the Donald J. Sobol stories, but there are some original stories too.) 
Encyclopedia Brown's Book of Wacky Cars (1987)
Encyclopedia Brown's Book of Wacky Outdoors (1988 )
Encyclopedia Brown's Book of Strange But True Crimes (1992)
Encyclopedia Brown and his Best Cases Ever (2013) (Note: This book is a commemorative book released in celebration of Encyclopedia Brown's 50th. anniversary. The book contains a letter from Donald J. Sobol detailing the history of the book series and its creation, as well as 15 cases selected from the previously published books.)
The Book of Puzzles and Games books (four books in all) were sometimes included in Encyclopedia Brown box sets with the original Encyclopedia Brown mystery books by Sobol.
Encyclopedia Brown books have also been released in ebook format, as well as on compact disc and audio cassette tape.

Solve-It-Yourself Mystery Sweepstakes
From January 15 to June 30, 1989, a special Solve-It-Yourself Mystery Sweepstakes was held in conjunction with the Encyclopedia Brown books and Bantam Books. In the back of specially marked copies of Encyclopedia Brown and the Case of the Treasure Hunt, Sobol presented an unsolved mystery for the contestant to solve and submit an answer for a chance to win a prize. The mystery for the contest was called "The Case of the Missing Birthday Gift", wherein Encyclopedia had to solve the case of a stolen bicycle that was given as a birthday gift to Willie Grant on his tenth birthday. The Tigers make an appearance as the suspects in the case; Bugs Meany, Jack Beck, and Rocky Graham all show up at the Tigers' clubhouse.

Contestants were allowed to enter as many times as they wished, provided they used a separate envelope for each entry. The sweepstakes was only available to USA and Canada residents. No purchase was necessary, as one could either use the official form in the back of specially marked copies of Encyclopedia Brown and the Case of the Treasure Hunt or send in a 3" by 5" index card with the solution and the contestant's contact information.

Parodies and tributes
The satirical newspaper The Onion ran an article in 2003 titled "Idaville Detective 'Encyclopedia' Brown Found Dead In Library Dumpster", which stated that Encyclopedia Brown, now a middle-aged police detective, had been murdered. The article parodied the books' tendency to have crimes solved through knowledge of trivia, and ended with Bugs Meany, who was now police commissioner, stating that he had an alibi for the murder in that "I was at the North Pole watching the penguins."

Ed Brubaker and Sean Phillips' Criminal: Last of the Innocent graphic novel features a reference to Encyclopedia Brown, with a grown-up analogue of Encyclopedia featured in the comic, as confirmed by Ed Brubaker himself.

The comic strip FoxTrot ran a 2000 storyline where Jason and Marcus try their hand at being private investigators, out to solve a theft perpetrated on their girlfriends. One agency name they tried was "Encyclopedias Brown And White" (due to Marcus being African-American), which became the title of FoxTrot'''s next book of comics.

The protagonist of the 2020 film The Kid Detective is a former child prodigy detective, now an unsuccessful adult, living in a small town.

In The Simpsons'' episode "500 Keys", the grave of Encyclopedia Brown is shown briefly next to those of Nancy Drew and the Hardy Boys, to which Lisa comments "Jeez, they're dropping like flies".

References

External links
Encyclopedia Brown at KidsReads.com
Encyclopedia Brown at Thrilling Detective

1989 American television series debuts
1989 American television series endings
Book series introduced in 1963
Brown, Encyclopedia
Edgar Award-winning works
Brown, Encyclopedia
HBO original programming
Series of children's books
1980s American children's television series
English-language television shows
Brown, Encyclopedia
American children's books
Children's mystery novels
Television shows filmed in Utah
American television shows based on children's books
Brown, Encyclopedia